This is an alphabetical list of the fungal taxa as recorded from South Africa. Currently accepted names have been appended.

Da
Genus: Dacryomitra 
Dacryomitra dubia Llovd.

Genus: Dacryomyces 
Dacryomyces australis Lloyd.
Dacryomyces deliquescens Duby.
Dacryomyces digressus Lloyd.
Dacryomyces tortus Fr.

Genus: Dactylina (Lichens)
Dactylina mollusca Tuck. 

Genus: Daedalea 
Daedalea biennis Fr.
Daedalea dregeana Mont.
Daedalea eatoni Berk.
Daedalea fuscospora Lloyd.
Daedalea hobbsii v.d.Byl.
Daedalea ligneotexta v.d.Byl.
Daedalea macowani Kalchbr. ex Thuem.
Daedalea ochracea Kalchbr. ex Thuem.
Daedalea quercina Fr.
Daedalea rhodesica v.d. Byl.
Daedalea stereoides Fr.
Daedalea unicolor Fr.

Genus: Daldinia 
Daldinia bakeri Lloyd.
Daldinia concentrica Ces. & De Not.
Daldinia concentrica var. eschscholzii Ehrenb. ex Fr.
Daldinia eschscholzii Rehm.

Genus: Darluca 
Darluca filum Cast.
Darluca vagans Cast. 

Genus: Dasyscypha 
Dasyscypha calyculaeformis Rehm.
Dasyscypha lachnoderma Rehm.

De
Genus: Deconica 
Deconica atro-rufa Sacc.

Genus: Delitschia 
Delitschia bisporula Hans.
Delitschia sp. 

Family: Dematiaceae

Genus: Dendroecia 
Dendroecia evansii Syd.

Genus: Dendrogaster 
Dendrogaster radiatus Zeller & Dodge

Genus: Dendryphium 
Dendryphium macowanianum Thuem.

Genus: Depazea 
Depazea briddleyae Thuem.
Depazea nesodes Thuem.

Genus: Dermatea 
Dermatea pelidna Kalchbr. & Cooke
Dermatea rufa Cooke

Family: Dermateaceae

Genus: Dermatina 
Dermatina pyrenocarpa Zahlbr.

Genus: Dermatiscum (Lichens)
Dermatiscum thunbergii Nyl
Dermatiscum viride Zahlbr.

Family: Dermatocarpaceae

Genus: Dermatocarpon  (Lichens)
Dermatocarpon deserti Zahlbr.
Dermatocarpon finckei Zahlbr.
Dermatocarpon hepaticum Th.Fr.
Dermatocarpon peltatum Zahlbr.

Di
Genus: Diacham 
Diacham elegans Fr.

Genus: Diachaea 
Diachaea leucopoda Rost.

Genus: Diachora 
Diachora lessertiae Petrak.

Genus: Diathrypton 
Diathrypton radians Syd.

Genus: Diaporthe 
Diaporthe citri Wolf.
Diaporthe pemiciosa E.Marchal.

Family: Diaportheae

Genus: Diatrype 
Diatrype auristroma Doidge
Diatrype bona-spei Berl.
Diatrype caminata Kalchbr. & Cooke
Diatrype capensis Kalchbr. & Cooke
Diatrype caulina Syd.
Diatrype conferta Doidge
Diatrype congesta Kalchbr. & Cooke
Diatrype dovyalidis Doidge
Diatrype durieui Mont.
Diatrype leonotidis Doidge
Diatrype macowaniana Thuem.
Diatrype xumenensis Doidge

Genus: Diatrypella 
Diatrypella agaves Syd.
Diatrypella morganae Doidge
Diatrypella natalensis Doidge
Diatrypella oligostroma Syd.
Diatrypella pretoriensis Doidge

Genus: Dicaeoma
Dicaeoma arundinellae Syd.
Dicaeoma rottboelliae Syd.

Genus: Dichlamys
Dichlamys trollipi Syd.

Genus: Dichodium
Dichodium byrsinum Nyl.
Dichodium subluridum Nyl.

Genus: Dictothrix
Dictothrix erysiphina Theiss.

Genus: Dictyocephalos
Dictyocephalos attenuatus Long & Plunkett.

Genus: Dictyochorella
Dictyochorella andropogonis Doidge

Genus: Dictyophora
Dictyophora indusiata Desv.
Dictyophora phalloidea Desv.

Genus: Diderma (Slime moulds)
Diderma effusum Morg.
Diderma hemisphericum Homem.
Diderma subdictyospermum Lister.

Genus: Didymella
Didymella intercepta Sacc.
Didymella lycopersici Kleb.
Didymella maculiformis Wint.
Didymella zuluensis Doidge.

Genus: Didvmellina
Didvmellina dianthi Burt.

Genus: Didymosphaeria
Didymosphaeria clavata du Pless.
Didymosphaeria opulenta Sacc.
Didymosphaeria populina Vuill.
Didymosphaeria rafniae Verw. & du Pless.
Didymosphaeria spatharum Wint.

Genus: Didymosporina
Didymosporina africana Syd.

Genus: Didymosporium
Didymosporium congestum Syd.
Didymosporium latum Syd.

Genus: Dimeriella
Dimeriella annulata Syd.
Dimeriella claviseta Doidge
Dimeriella grewiae Theiss.
Dimeriella woodii Hansf.

Genus: Dimerina
Dimerina osyridis Theiss.
Dimerina parasitica Hansf.
Dimerina verrucicola Theiss.

Genus: Dimerium
Dimerium africanum Hansf.
Dimerium baccharidicolum Sacc.
Dimerium englerianum Sacc. & D.Sacc.
Dimerium erysiphinum Sacc.
Dimerium gymnosporiae Syd.
Dimerium intermedium Syd.
Dimerium langloisii Theiss.
Dimerium leonense Hansf.
Dimerium lepidogathis Sacc.
Dimerium leptosporum Speg.
Dimerium macowanianum Doidge
Dimerium minutum Sacc.
Dimerium myriadeum Theiss.
Dimerium piceum Theiss.
Dimerium psilostomatis Sacc.
Dimerium pulveraceum Theiss.
Dimerium radio-fissilis Sacc.
Dimerium subferrugineum Syd.

Genus: Dimerosporiopsis
Dimerosporiopsis engleriana P.Henn.

Genus: Dimerosporium
Dimerosporium acocantherae P.Henn.
Dimerosporium englerianum P.Henn.
Dimerosporium erysiphinum P.Henn.
Dimerosporium gymnosporiae P.Henn.
Dimerosporium lepidagathis P.Henn.
Dimerosporium macowanianum Sacc.
Dimerosporium osyridis Wint.
Dimerosporium psilostomatis Sacc.
Dimerosporium verrucicolum Wint.
Dimerosporium sp.

Genus: Diorchidium
Diorchidium tricholaenae Syd.
Diorchidium woodii Kalchbr. & Cooke

Genus: Diplocarpon
Diplocarpon earliana Wolf.
Diplocarpon rosae Wolf.

Genus: Diplochorella
Diplochorella amphimelaena Theiss. & Syd.
Diplochorella burchelliae Syd.

Genus: Diplocystis
Diplocystis junodii Pole Evans & Bottomley

Genus: Diplodia
Diplodia aurantii Catt.
Diplodia cassinopsidis Kalchbr. & Cooke.
Diplodia clematidea Sacc.
Diplodia clematidis Kalchbr. & Cooke
Diplodia herbarum Lev.
Diplodia lichenopsis Cooke & Mass.
Diplodia maydis Sacc.
Diplodia monsterae Verw. & Dipp.
Diplodia natalensis Pole Evans
Diplodia palmicola Thuem.
Diplodia pinea Kickx.
Diplodia sarmentorum Fr.
Diplodia tubericola Taubenh.
Diplodia variispora Died.
Diplodia vignae Sacc.

Family: Diploschistaceae

Genus: Diploschistella
Diploschistella urceolata Vain.

Genus: Diploschistes (Lichens)
Diploschistes actinostomus Zahlbr.
Diploschistes actinostomus var. aeneus Steiner
Diploschistes actinostomus var. caesioplumbeus Steiner
Diploschistes anactinus Zahlbr.
Diploschistes bellus Zahlbr.
Diploschistes cinereocaesius Wain.
Diploschistes deuterius Zahlbr.
Diploschistes isabellinus Zahlbr.
Diploschistes ochroniger Zahlbr.
Diploschistes perispicillatus Zahlbr.
Diploschistes scruposus Norm.
Diploschistes scruposus f. iridatus Zahlbr.
Diploschistes scruposus var. arenarius Müll.Arg.
Diploschistes subcupreus Zahlbr.

Family: Dirinaceae

Genus: Dirina (Lichens)
Dirina capensis Fée.

Genus: Discina
Discina submembranaceae P. Henn.

Genus: Disciseda
Disciseda anomala G.H.Cunn.
Disciseda candida Lloyd.
Disciseda candida Bottomley.
Disciseda cervina Hollos.
Disciseda hypogaea Cunningham.
Disciseda juglandiformis Hollos.
Disciseda pedicellata Hollos.
Disciseda verrucosa G.H.Cunn.
Disciseda zeyheri Hollos.

Genus: Discomyces
Discomyces madurae Gedoelst
Discomyces pijperi Neveu-Lemaire.

Do
Genus: Dothidasteromella
Dothidasteromella contorta Doidge
Dothidasteromella orbiculata Syd.

Family: Dothideaceae

Genus: Dothidea
Dothidea aloicola P.Henn.
Dothidea amphimelaena Mont.
Dothidea arduina Kalchbr. & Cooke
Dothidea circinata Kalchbr. & Cooke
Dothidea crotonis Cooke
Dothidea kniphojiae Kalchbr. & Cooke
Dothidea lucens Cooke
Dothidea melianthi Kalchbr. & Cooke
Dothidea oleifolia Kalchbr. & Cooke
Dothidea perisporioides Berk. & Curt.
Dothidea puncta Cooke
Dothidea repens Berk
Dothidea scabies Kalchbr. & Cooke
Dothidea strelitziae Cooke
Dothidea viventis var. albizziae Cooke

Genus: Dothidella
Dothidella osyridis Berl. & Vogl.
Dothidella osyridis var. tassiana Sacc.
Dothidella welwitschii A.L.Sm.

Genus: Dothidina
Dothidina disciformis Theiss. & Syd.

Genus: Dothiopsis
Dothiopsis stangeriae Verw. & du Pless.

Genus: Dothiorella
Dothiorella congesta Sacc.
Dothiorella mali Ell. & Everh.
Dothiorella reniformis Vi. & Rav.
Dothiorella senecionis Petrak.

Du
Genus: Dufourea
Dufourea flammea Ach.
Dufourea mollusca Ach.
Dufourea physcioides Massal.
Dufourea plumbea Tayl.

References

Sources

See also

 List of fungi of South Africa
 List of fungi of South Africa – A
 List of fungi of South Africa – B
 List of fungi of South Africa – C

 List of fungi of South Africa – E
 List of fungi of South Africa – F
 List of fungi of South Africa – G
 List of fungi of South Africa – H
 List of fungi of South Africa – I
 List of fungi of South Africa – J
 List of fungi of South Africa – K
 List of fungi of South Africa – L
 List of fungi of South Africa – M
 List of fungi of South Africa – N
 List of fungi of South Africa – O
 List of fungi of South Africa – P
 List of fungi of South Africa – Q
 List of fungi of South Africa – R
 List of fungi of South Africa – S
 List of fungi of South Africa – T
 List of fungi of South Africa – U
 List of fungi of South Africa – V
 List of fungi of South Africa – W
 List of fungi of South Africa – X
 List of fungi of South Africa – Y
 List of fungi of South Africa – Z

Further reading
Kinge TR, Goldman G, Jacobs A, Ndiritu GG, Gryzenhout M (2020) A first checklist of macrofungi for South Africa. MycoKeys 63: 1-48. https://doi.org/10.3897/mycokeys.63.36566

  

Fungi
Fungi D